Tan Sri Datuk Amar Stephen Kalong Ningkan (20 August 1920 – 31 March 1997) was a Malaysian politician who served as the first Chief Minister of Sarawak from 1963 to 1966.

Early life and education 
Stephen Kalong Ningkan was born on 20 August 1920 in Betong, Sarawak which was then administered under the Second Division of Simanggang. He was a student at St. Augustine's school.

Ningkan was of mixed Iban and Chinese parentage, and his Chinese name was Mok Teck Boon. Ningkan's grandfather, Mok Bak Seng, was born in Foshan, Guangdong, China in 1870. At six years old, he took Ningkan to China for several years so that Ningkan could learn the culture and way of life there. His grandfather died on October 20, 1963, at the grand old age of 93, a few months after Ningkan took office as chief minister.

Ningkan's mother, Kuni anak Karong, died of stomach complications on 14 June 1969, at the age of 71.

After Ningkan completed his education, he worked as a rubber fund clerk from 1938 to 1939. He resigned his job to join the Sarawak Constabulary from 1940 to 1946. He was a police constable in the year 1942. In 1944, he joined the Services Reconnaissance Department (SRD), an underground movement based in Jesselton (present day Kota Kinabalu). He became a teacher at his former school in Betong from 1947 to 1950.

Ningkan then worked at a Shell Company hospital in Kuala Belait, Brunei for several years. He also took up law via correspondence from Regent Institute and Metropolitan College at St Albans, London, respectively. At the hospital, he was the chairman of the Shell Dayak Club.

He became the founder and president of the Sarawak Dayak Association from 1958 to 1960.

Hobbies and interests
Ningkan learnt the Japanese language during the Japanese Occupation in Sarawak. The Japanese song, Kuni No Hana (Flower of the Nation) was one of his favourites. He was also spotted for singing Terang Bulan in various government and family functions. Ningkan was a fan of P. Ramlee and Sgt Hassan was one of his favourite movies.

Early political career 
Ningkan returned to Betong and established the Sarawak National Party (SNAP) on 10 April 1961, by uniting the Iban people of Saribas. Although he initially did not accept Tunku Abdul Rahman's proposal for the formation of Malaysia, he eventually became a strong supporter of the federation.

Ningkan never completed his law degree because he had to focus on his political activities. He also insisted that his party should be multiracial, given his background of having a Chinese grandfather and friends of various races.

In October 1962, as the SNAP secretary-general, Ningkan launched the Sarawak chapter of the Alliance Party, which consisted of Parti Pesaka Sarawak (PESAKA), Barisan Ra'ayat Jati Sarawak (BARJASA), Parti Negara Sarawak (PANAS) and Sarawak Chinese Association (SCA) in anticipation of the 1963 district council elections. In the election, SNAP under the Sarawak Alliance managed to get the majority of local council seats (i.e., after the support of one independent winner from Binatang by the name of Jimbat Anak Intan from Meradong Scheme B tipped the balance of the number of seats won by the Sarawak Alliance and the opposition pact of SUPP and PANAS). This crucial support, plus other independents, enabled the Alliance to appoint a majority of divisional, state assembly, and parliamentary members. This earned Ningkan the trust to become the first Chief Minister of Sarawak.

Chief Minister 
Ningkan was appointed as the first Chief Minister of Sarawak on 22 July 1963 by the then Governor, Sir Alexander Waddell. Supreme Council was also formed with members such as Abdul Taib Mahmud, James Wong Kim Ming, Dunstan Endawie Enchana, Awang Hipni Pengiran Anu and Teo Kui Seng.

Ningkan had a strong anti-communist stand during his tenure as chief minister. He also opposed the National Language and Education policies. The three principal advisers for Stephen Kalong Ningkan were Ting Tung Ming, Tony Shaw, and John Pike. Ting Tung Ming was Sibu Foochow, an SCA party member, and Ningkan's political secretary. Tony Shaw was Cambridge educated expatriate, who joined Sarawak civil service since 1948 and worked as Sarawak state secretary. John Pike was an Oxford graduate expatriate who join the Sarawak civil service since 1949 and was the former Sarawak state secretary.

In 1965, the federal government tried to open a UMNO branch in Sarawak, trying to unite the Sarawak Malays from BARJASA and PANAS parties. However, the plan did not materialise. Such action from the federal government had annoyed Ningkan.

1965 land bill crisis
A land committee report was produced in mid-1962 to "make
recommendations as to the measures necessary to ensure the best use of land in the
national interest." In December 1963, Land Code (Amendment) Bill was passed in the Council Negri, establishing free issue of land title under Native Customary Rights (NCR) lands. Building upon the Land Code (Amendment) Bill, the Sarawak government introduced three other bills, on matters pertaining to establishing ownership, protecting NCR holdings, and how the government could acquire and pay compensation for NCR land. The contents of the three bills were published for public discussion in February 1964. The aim of these bills were to develop the NCR lands for large-scale plantations by landless Chinese farmers, thus helping to combat communist insurgency at that time. Besides, safeguards were also written to protect native interests. The bills were to be tabled in the Council Negri on 11 March 1965 but was postopned to 11 May to make time for amendment of Land (Native Dealings) Bill. However, on 10 May 1965, PANAS, PESAKA, and BARJASA formed Sarawak Native Alliance, with Temenggung Jugah as the president, Abdul Taib Mahmud (BARJASA) and Thomas Kana (PESAKA) as joint secretaries. Haji Su'ut bin Tahir, president of Barisan Pemuda Sarawak, opposed the land bill. On 11 May 1965, BARJASA and PESAKA withdrew from Sarawak Alliance. The withdrawal cost the Sarawak Alliance 22 out of 39 seats in the Council Negri, thus threatening the integrity of the Sarawak government. Ningkan quickly withdrew the land bill on the same day and the crisis was averted. In the news, the bill was reported to be withdrawn on "strong opposition by Malays and Dayak communities", without any mention of withdrawal of BARJASA and PESAKA from the Sarawak Alliance. After the incident, John Pike advised Ningkan to remove ex officio member expatriates, that is John Pike himself, Tony Shaw, and attorney general Philip Pike from the Supreme Council and replace them with three new ministries to be filled by local politicians. The bill to remove the three Supreme Council members was tabled on 12 May 1965 and passed on 13 May. PESAKA withdrew its resignation from Sarawak Alliance in writing immediately after the withdrawal of the land bill. Ningkan then announced that the two vacant seats left by the expatriates would be filled by PESAKA and the remaining one seat would be filled by PANAS. Meanwhile, Ningkan accepted the resignation of BERJASA from the Sarawak Alliance, and BARJASA would need to give up its two ministerial posts in the government. However, Abdul Rahman Ya'kub, a leader from BARJASA, argued that BARJASA too had withdrawn their resignation by telephone. Despite this, Ningkan denied receiving any phone call from BARJASA.

Tackling communist insurgency
Sarawak United Peoples' Party (SUPP) was still an opposition party when Ningkan was in office. He had ordered the closure of several SUPP branches in Lundu, Sarikei and Jakar, citing infiltration of these branches by the communists. In August 1965, Singapore was separated from Malaysia. Stephen Yong Kuet Tze, the then SUPP secretary-general, proposed revising the terms of Sarawak's incorporation into Malaysia. Although there are valid questions about the legitimacy of the Constitution of Malaysia after Singapore was expelled, Yong's sentiments coincided with the communist objectives of seceding Sarawak from Malaysia. Such sentiment angered Ningkan, and he warned the party not to "echo any Communist slogan" or the government would act swiftly against the party. He also told SUPP not to make any suggestions "that will distract the people from our immediate goal of destroying internal communist subversion."

During the administration of Ningkan, various anti-communist operations were conducted by Malaysian and British troops, and on 6 July 1965, Operation Hammer was started to resettle the Chinese living along the 10th to 25th mile along the Kuching-Serian road into a village fenced with barbed wire. A total of 50,000 Chinese were resettled. Operation Letterbox was also started to allow the Chinese in the resettled areas to fill in questionnaires providing information about the communist activities in the area.

Constitutional crisis and removal from power 

In 1966, with the alleged backing of the federal government, the Sarawak state assemblymen started to pass a motion of no confidence against Ningkan. Then Malaysia's prime minister, Tunku Abdul Rahman, pushed for Ningkan's resignation.

On 16 June 1966, Ningkan was ousted when Governor Abang Openg Abang Sapiee showed him a letter of no confidence issued by 21 out of 42 legislators and asked Ningkan to resign as chief minister. He refused, saying the letters were not tantamount to a vote of no confidence in the Council Negri (present day Sarawak State Legislative Assembly). He was eventually sacked by the governor, and Tawi Sli was appointed to replace him.

Dissatisfied with the governor's action, Ningkan took the case to the Kuching High Court. He named the governor as the first defendant and Tawi Sli as the second defendant. Eventually, Ningkan was reinstated by the court on 7 September 1966, which saw the necessity of a formal vote of no confidence. Chief Justice of Borneo Justice Harley in his judgement ruled that the governor can only dismiss the Chief Minister when both of these conditions are satisfied: the Chief Minister has lost the confidence of the House; and the Chief Minister has refused to resign and failed to advise a dissolution. Ningkan won the court case, and he returned to his office.

Upon his reinstatement as the chief minister, Ningkan tried to initiate a dissolution of the Council Negri to seek a fresh mandate from the voters, but the federal government decided to impose a state of emergency in Sarawak, citing chaos in the state. The federal government also amended the Sarawak Constitution to give the power to the state's governor to commence the Council Negri meeting.

A vote of non-confidence was passed on 23 September 1966, and this resulted in the removal of Ningkan from the chief minister's office for the second time.

Aftermath 
After his second removal, Ningkan decided to take the case to the Federal Court of Malaysia. He argued that the amendment to the Sarawak constitution was illegal because the state of emergency was declared in extraordinary circumstances. However, the federal court ruled that the word "emergency" has a broad meaning and it also includes the Sarawak constitutional crisis. On 1 August 1968, the Judicial Committee of the Privy Council rejected Ningkan's appeal.

Death 
Ningkan died peacefully on 31 March 1997, at the age of 76, at the Normah Specialist Medical Centre in Kuching. His funeral was held at St. Thomas Cathedral, and he was buried at the Anglican Cemetery at Jalan Batu Kitang. The lyrics of Terang Bulan were engraved on the back of his tombstone.

Legacy

Namesakes 
Several places were named after him, including:
 Dewan Sukan Tan Sri Datuk Amar Stephen Kalong Ningkan, a multipurpose hall in Betong, Sarawak
 Jalan Datuk Amar Kalong Ningkan, a road in Kuching, Sarawak
 Jalan Ningkan, a road in Sri Aman, Sarawak

Honours

Honours of Malaysia
  :
  Recipient of the Malaysian Commemorative Medal (Gold) (PPM) (1965)
  Commander of the Order of Loyalty to the Crown of Malaysia (PSM) – Tan Sri (1995)
  :
  Commander of the Order of the Star of Hornbill Sarawak (PGBK) – Datuk
 Knight Commander of the Most Exalted Order of the Star of Sarawak (PNBS) – Dato' (1964)
  Knight Commander of the Order of the Star of Hornbill Sarawak (DA) – Datuk Amar (1988)

References 

Malaysian Anglicans
Iban people
1920 births
Malaysian people of Cantonese descent
1997 deaths
Malaysian people of Chinese descent
Chief Ministers of Sarawak
Sarawak state ministers
Sarawak National Party politicians
People from Sarawak
Members of the Sarawak State Legislative Assembly
Commanders of the Order of the Star of Hornbill Sarawak
Knights Commander of the Order of the Star of Hornbill Sarawak
Knights Commander of the Most Exalted Order of the Star of Sarawak
Commanders of the Order of Loyalty to the Crown of Malaysia